The 1969 Open Championship was the 98th Open Championship, held from 9–12 July at the Royal Lytham & St Annes Golf Club in Lytham St Annes, England. Tony Jacklin won the first of his two major championships, two strokes ahead of Bob Charles.

Jacklin was the first Briton to win The Open since 1951, and it was another sixteen years until the next, Sandy Lyle in 1985.

It was the fifth Open Championship at Lytham & St Annes, which has hosted eleven times, most recently in 2012.

Past champions in the field

Made both cuts

Round summaries

First round
Wednesday, 9 July 1969

Second round
Thursday, 10 July 1969

Amateurs: Tupling (+2), Bonallack (+4), Fleisher (+5), Buckley (+6), Humphreys (+8), McGuirk (+8), Foster (+11), Hayes (+13), Kippax (+16), King (+17), Glading (+20)

Third round
Friday, 11 July 1969

Amateurs: Bonallack (+6), Tupling (+9), Buckley (+10), Fleisher (+10), Humphreys (+12), McGuirk (+15).

Final round
Saturday, 12 July 1969

Amateurs: Tupling (+10), Bonallack (+14)
Source:

References

External links
Royal Lytham & St Annes 1969 (Official site)

The Open Championship
Golf tournaments in England
Open Championship
Open Championship
Open Championship